Papendorf may refer to:

Papendorf (Warnow)
Papendorf, Uecker-Randow
Papendorf, the German name for Rubene in Latvia